Earle Gilmore Wheeler (January 13, 1908 – December 18, 1975), nicknamed Bus, was a United States Army general who served as the chief of Staff of the United States Army from 1962 to 1964 and then as the sixth chairman of the Joint Chiefs of Staff (1964–1970), holding the latter position during the Vietnam War.

Early life and education
Earle Gilmore Wheeler was born in Washington, D.C. on January 13, 1908 to Dock Stone and Ida Gilmore. He was later adopted by Ida's second husband. Wheeler began his military career in 1924, at the age of 16, as a private in Company E, 121st Engineers, District of Columbia National Guard. He was promoted to sergeant in 1926, then, in 1928, was honorably discharged in order to enroll at the United States Military Academy. He graduated from the Academy in 1932 and was commissioned into the infantry. After graduation he married Frances "Betty" Rogers Howell, whom he met at a society party in 1930. He served in the 29th Infantry Regiment from 1932 to 1936, then attended Infantry School in 1937. He served with the 15th Infantry Regiment, from 1937 to 1940, stationed in China from 1937 to 1938.

Career
From 1940 to 1941, Wheeler was a mathematics instructor at West Point. Rising from battalion commander to more senior roles, he trained the newly activated 36th and 99th Infantry Divisions from 1941 to 1944, then went to Europe in November 1944 as chief of staff of the newly formed 63rd Infantry Division.

Wheeler served in senior staff positions in a variety of specialties, including supply, intelligence, planning, and armor.

In late 1945, Wheeler returned to the U.S. as an artillery instructor at Fort Sill, then returned to Germany from 1947 to 1949 as a staff officer of the United States Constabulary (formerly VI Corps), occupying Germany. He attended the National War College in 1950. He then returned to Europe as a staff officer in NATO, in a series of roles. In 1951–52 he commanded the 351st Infantry Regiment, which controlled the Free Territory of Trieste, a front-line position of the Cold War.

In 1955, Wheeler joined the General Staff at The Pentagon. In 1958 he took command of the 2nd Armored Division. In 1959, he took command of III Corps. He became Director of the Joint Staff in 1960. In 1962 he was briefly Deputy Commander of U.S. Forces in Europe before being named Chief of Staff of the United States Army later that year.

Chairman of the Joint Chiefs of Staff

President Lyndon B. Johnson appointed Wheeler Chairman of the Joint Chiefs of Staff in July 1964 to succeed General Maxwell Taylor. Wheeler's tenure as the nation's top military officer spanned the height of America's involvement in the Vietnam War.

Wheeler's accession to the top job in the U.S. military, over the heads of officers with more combat experience, drew some criticism. Then Air Force Chief of Staff, General Curtis LeMay, called him "Polly Parrot" and said he was awarded a medal for "fighting the Battle of Fort Benning", an army post in Georgia where Wheeler served during much of World War II.

Wheeler oversaw and supported the expanding U.S. military role in the Vietnam War in the mid-1960s, consistently backing the field commander's requests for additional troops and operating authority. He often urged President Johnson to strike harder at North Vietnam and to expand aerial bombing campaigns. Wheeler was concerned with minimizing costs to U.S. ground troops. At the same time, he preferred what he saw as a realistic assessment of the capabilities of the South Vietnamese military. This earned him a reputation as a "hawk."

Wheeler, with General William C. Westmoreland, the field commander, and President Johnson, pushed to raise additional American forces after the February 1968 Tet Offensive. American media at the time widely reported the Tet Offensive as Viet Cong victory. This followed a widely noted news report in 1967 that cited an unnamed American general (later identified as General Frederick C. Weyand) who called the situation in Vietnam a "stalemate." It was a view with which Wheeler agreed in more confidential circles. However, Wheeler was concerned that the American buildup in Vietnam depleted U.S. military capabilities in other parts of the world. He called for 205,000 additional ground troops, to be gained by mobilizing reserves, but intended these remain in the US as an active reserve. The president decided this was not easily accomplished. Together with the Tet Offensive and shifts in American public opinion, this abortive effort contributed to President Johnson's ultimate decision to de-escalate the war.

After the election of President Richard M. Nixon, Wheeler oversaw the implementation of the "Vietnamization" program, whereby South Vietnamese forces assumed increasing responsibility for the war as American forces were withdrawn.

Wheeler retired from the U.S. Army in July 1970. Wheeler was the longest-serving Chairman of the Joint Chiefs to date, serving six years. Upon his retirement, he was awarded the Defense Distinguished Service Medal and was the first recipient of that decoration.

Death

Wheeler died in Frederick, Maryland after a heart attack on 18 December 1975.

Dates of rank

* postwar reduction

Decorations and medals

References

External links
 ANC Explorer
 

United States Army Chiefs of Staff
United States Military Academy alumni
Recipients of the Defense Distinguished Service Medal
Recipients of the Distinguished Service Medal (US Army)
Recipients of the Legion of Merit
Recipients of the Legion of Honour
Recipients of the Croix de Guerre (France)
United States Army personnel of World War II
Burials at Arlington National Cemetery
1908 births
1975 deaths
United States Army Infantry Branch personnel
United States Army Corps of Engineers personnel
Chairmen of the Joint Chiefs of Staff
United States Army personnel of the Vietnam War
American adoptees
Recipients of the Air Force Distinguished Service Medal